Florian Fritz (born 17 January 1984) is a French former rugby union rugby player. His usual position was in the centre. He most played most of his career for Stade Toulousain in the Top 14 club competition in France. Fritz has also played for France.

He played his first Heineken Cup match during the 2003–04 tournament, scoring a try in his fifth match against Gloucester for CS Bourgoin-Jallieu. Fritz moved to Toulouse in 2004 and he scored two tries for Toulouse during their 2004-05 Heineken Cup campaign, with Toulouse eventually winning the tournament, defeating fellow French side, Stade Français 18 points to 12. He won the Heineken Cup for a second time in 2010, this time scoring a penalty and a drop goal in the final.

His good form at Toulouse was rewarded with selection in the France squad for the 2005 mid-year Test against South Africa. He went on to make his international debut against the Springboks on 18 June in Durban which resulted in a 30-all draw. That year Fritz earned further international caps for France in matches against Australia in Marseille and South Africa in Paris. He played for France during the 2006 Six Nations Championship, playing his first Six Nations match against Scotland on 5 February. Although France lost that match 16 to 20, France went on to win the tournament. He was named in the French Rugby Squad for the Six Nations in 2009.

International tries

References

External links
France profile at FFR
RBS 6 Nations profile
Florian Fritz on ercrugby.com
Florian Fritz on stade-toulousain.fr 
Florian Fritz on sporting-heroes.net

1984 births
Living people
French rugby union players
Sportspeople from Sens
Stade Toulousain players
Rugby union centres
France international rugby union players